The eastern amberwing (Perithemis tenera) is a species of dragonfly in the family Libellulidae. 
It is very small, reaching a total length of no more than 25 mm.
The males have orange or amber wings.  Both sexes have a red pterostigma. 
The eastern amberwing dragonfly is one of the only types of dragonfly that actively mimics a wasp. The yellow and brown stripes on its abdomen encourage predators to stay away. When perched, they will wiggle their abdomen and wings in a wasp-like fashion to deter other animals from eating it. 
Males have an elaborate courtship ritual. When a female approaches his territory, the male will lead her to his selected egg-laying site and hover above it with wings whirring and abdomen raised.

The common name refers to its eastern range, although this dragonfly does extend westward well into the central part of the United States. The scientific name, tenera, means delicate and alludes to its small size.

Gallery

References

External links

 Perithemis tenera on BugGuide.Net
 

Libellulidae
Odonata of North America
Insects of Canada
Insects of the United States
Fauna of the Eastern United States
Insects described in 1840